Zebedee Jones (born 12 March 1970) is a British abstract painter.

Life and work

Zebedee Jones was born in London. He attended Camberwell College of Arts, Norwich University of the Arts and Chelsea School of Art and Design graduating in 1993. The following year Jones's paintings appeared in Unbound: possibilities in painting at the Hayward Gallery. His work is in several public collections  including Tate, National Galleries of Scotland and the Arts Council of Great Britain Collection.

Jones's work consists of monochrome abstracts, which have been described as adjacent to Neo-conceptual art or belonging to the Process Art tradition. His canvases are stretched over deep frames. The paint appears scraped on in layers, usually horizontal. The dragged surface of the canvas rather than being smooth has varying degrees of surface incident.

Zebedee Jones lives and works in London.

Collection
Jones' work is held in the following public collection:
Tate Gallery, London

Exhibitions

Solo exhibitions
Slewe Gallery, Amsterdam, NL, 2013
Agnew’s Gallery, London, UK, 2011
Mummery + Schnelle, London, UK, 2008
Slewe Gallery, Amsterdam, NL, 2007
Danese, New York, NY, 2005
Slewe Gallery, Amsterdam, NL, 2004
New Arts Centre, Salisbury, UK, 2003
Danese, New York, NY, 2002
Slewe Gallery, Amsterdam, NL, 2001
Danese, New York, NY, 1999
Waddington Galleries, London (cat.), 1998
Green on Red Gallery, Dublin, IR, 1998
Patrick de Brock, Knokke, BE, 1997
Waddington Galleries, London, UK, 1997
Karsten Schubert, London, UK, 1995

Selected group exhibitions
Group Exhibition, Slewe Gallery, Amsterdam, NL, 2007
10 Years Slewe, Slewe Gallery, Amsterdam, NL (cat.), 2004
Galerie Lelong, Zurich, SW, 2003
Group Show, Pippy Houldsworth, London, UK, 2002
Visione Britannica III, Valentina Moncada, Rome, IT, 1999
Passion, Gasworks, London, UK
Elegant Austerity, Waddington Galleries, London, UK, 1998
Foundations for Fame, The London Institute Gallery, London, UK, 1997
Ace! Arts Council Collection new Purchases, touring exhibition to Hatton Gallery, Newcastle / Hayward Gallery, London / Ikon Gallery, Birmingham, UK
Mostly Monochrome, Green on Red Gallery, Dublin, IR, 1996
Real Art, Southampton City Art Gallery / Leeds City Art Gallery / Stedelijk Museum, Aalst, BE (cat.), 1996

References

External links 
Robert-Jan Muller, Zebedee Jones at Slewe Gallery, June 2013
Ishmael Annobil, Zebedee Jones at Agnew's Gallery, Chiaroscuro Magazine, 2011
Grace Glueck, ART IN REVIEW; Zebedee Jones, The New York Times, Nov 19, 1999

20th-century English painters
English male painters
21st-century English painters
1970 births
Living people
English contemporary artists
Painters from London
Alumni of Camberwell College of Arts
Alumni of Chelsea College of Arts
Alumni of Norwich University of the Arts
20th-century English male artists
21st-century English male artists